Veijo Tahvanainen (born 27 September 1938 in Ilomantsi) is a Finnish orienteering competitor. He received a silver medal in the relay event and finished 10th in the individual event at the 1968 World Orienteering Championships in Linköping. In 1970 he finished 14th in the individual event, and 4th with the Finnish relay team. At the 1972 World Orienteering Championships in Staré Splavy, he placed 9th in the individual contest, and was part of the Swiss relay team (which was disqualified).

See also
 Finnish orienteers
 List of orienteers
 List of orienteering events

References

1938 births
Living people
People from Ilomantsi
Finnish orienteers
Male orienteers
Foot orienteers
World Orienteering Championships medalists
Sportspeople from North Karelia